Tachytrechus notatus is a species of fly in the family Dolichopodidae. It is found in the  Palearctic .

References

External links
Images representing Tachytrechus at BOLD

Dolichopodinae
Insects described in 1831
Diptera of Europe